Valcour may refer to:

 Aline and Valcour, novel
 USS Valcour, ship
 Valcour Aime (1797–1867), American businessman
 Valcour Bay, strait
 Valcour Formation, geologic formation
 Valcour Island, island in New York
 Valcour Records, record label

See also
 Valcourt (disambiguation)